WID may stand for:

  River Wid, Essex, England
 Windows Internal Database
 Women in Development
 World Inequality Database